Tony Bray may refer to:
 Tony Bray (1926–2014), English stockbroker who dated Margaret Thatcher
 Anthony "Abaddon" Bray (born 1960), drummer of the English band Venom